Sagittaria platyphylla, the delta arrowhead, broad-leaf arrowhead or delta duck-potato, is a plant species native to the eastern United States. The core of its range extends from central Texas to the Florida Panhandle north to southern Illinois.

As an ornamental it has also been spread to other locations. Isolated populations have been reported from Washington state, Missouri, Kansas, Ohio, Kentucky, Pennsylvania, West Virginia, eastern Virginia, North and South Carolina and eastern Georgia, Nuevo León, Michoacán and Panamá. It has also become a noxious weed in Australia. On August 6, 2015 S. platyphylla was found for the first time in China, specifically in the Yangtze River Basin. This detection was in an irrigation ditch in Zhangjiashai, Wuhan, Hubei, PRC. Other detections have continued through at least 2019 demonstrating its establishment in provinces of the middle and lower Yangtze. It presents a significant threat to the ecology and economy of the Yangtze area, especially to agricultural irrigation.

Morphology
The plant is an emergent aquatic found in ponds, lakes and slow-moving streams. The plant reproduces by means of stolons as well as seeds. Some leaves are totally submerged, others emergent (raising above the surface of the water). Submerged leaves have flattened petioles but no true blades. Inflorescence is a raceme with 3-9 whorls of flowers.

References

platyphylla
Root vegetables
Freshwater plants
Flora of the Southeastern United States
Flora of Panama
Flora of Nuevo León
Flora of Washington (state)
Flora of Ohio
Flora of West Virginia
Flora of Kentucky
Flora of Pennsylvania
Flora of Michoacán
Flora of Kansas
Flora of Australia
Plants described in 1894
Flora without expected TNC conservation status